Sarab (electoral district) is the 6th electoral district in the East Azerbaijan Province of Iran. This electoral district has a population of 131,934 and elects 1 member of parliament.

1980
MP in 1980 from the electorate of Ahar and Heris. (1st)
 Yadollah Dehghani

1984
MP in 1984 from the electorate of Ahar and Heris. (2nd)
 Ghasem Memari

1988
MP in 1988 from the electorate of Ahar and Heris. (3rd)
 ?

1992
MP in 1992 from the electorate of Ahar and Heris. (4th)
 Mohmud Ruhbakhsh

1996
MP in 1996 from the electorate of Ahar and Heris. (5th)
 Hosein Anvari

2000
MP in 2000 from the electorate of Ahar and Heris. (6th)
 Hosein Anvari

2004
MP in 2004 from the electorate of Ahar and Heris. (7th)
 Amir Sanati Mehrbani

2008
MP in 2008 from the electorate of Ahar and Heris. (8th)
 Majid Nasirpour

2012
MP in 2012 from the electorate of Ahar and Heris. (9th)
 Mahnaz Bahmani

2016

Notes

References

Electoral districts of East Azerbaijan
Sarab County
Deputies of Sarab